Llashkadrenoc is a village in Malishevë municipality, Kosovo.

Notes

References 

Villages in Mališevo